The Sacramento Bee is a daily newspaper published in Sacramento, California, in the United States. Since its foundation in 1857, The Bee has become the largest newspaper in Sacramento, the fifth largest newspaper in California, and the 27th largest paper in the U.S. It is distributed in the upper Sacramento Valley, with a total circulation area that spans about : south to Stockton, California, north to the Oregon border, east to Reno, Nevada, and west to the San Francisco Bay Area.

The Bee is the flagship of the nationwide McClatchy Company. Its "Scoopy Bee" mascot, created by Walt Disney in 1943, has been used by all three Bee newspapers (in Sacramento, Modesto, and Fresno).

History 
Under the name The Daily Bee, the first issue of the newspaper was published on February 3, 1857, proudly boasting that "the object of this newspaper is not only independence, but permanence". At this time, The Bee was in competition with the Sacramento Union, a newspaper founded in 1851. Although The Bee soon surpassed the Union in popularity, the Union survived until its closure in 1994, leaving The Sacramento Bee to be the longest-running newspaper in the city's history.

The first editor of The Sacramento Bee was John Rollin Ridge, but James McClatchy took over the position by the end of the first week.

Also within a week of its creation, The Bee uncovered a state scandal which led to the impeachment of Know-Nothing California State Treasurer Henry Bates.

21st century 
On March 13, 2006, The McClatchy Company announced its agreement to purchase Knight Ridder, the United States' second-largest chain of daily newspapers. The purchase price of $4.5 billion in cash and stock gave McClatchy 32 daily newspapers in 29 markets, with a total circulation of 3.3 million.

On February 3, 2007, the paper celebrated its 150th anniversary, and a copy of the original issue was included in every newspaper. On February 4, 2007, a 120-page section was included about the paper's history from its founding to today. In 2008, The Sacramento Bee redesigned and changed its layout.

Recognition 
The Sacramento Bee has won six Pulitzer Prizes in its history. It has won numerous other awards, including many for its progressive public service campaigns promoting free speech (the Bee often criticized government policy, and uncovered many scandals hurting Californians), anti-racism (The Bee supported the Union during the American Civil War and publicly denounced the Ku Klux Klan), worker's rights (The Bee has a strong history of supporting unionization), and environmental protection (leading numerous tree-planting campaigns and fighting against environmental destruction in the Sierra Nevada).

Notable people
Deborah Blum – science writer
Renée C. Byer – photojournalist
Gil Duran – California opinion editor and former Press Secretary for California governor Jerry Brown.
Jack Ohman – cartoonist
Nick Peters – baseball writer
Paul Avery – journalist who reported on the Zodiac killer
Nancy Weaver Teichert – former reporter

References

External links 

 The Sacramento Bee
 CapitolAlert.com Capitol politics by The Sacramento Bee
 Sacramento Bee - Sacramento LocalWiki
 

 McClatchy Company records - Center for Sacramento History

Daily newspapers published in California
Mass media in Sacramento, California
Mass media in Sacramento County, California
Pulitzer Prize-winning newspapers
Newspapers established in 1857
McClatchy publications
1857 establishments in California
Pulitzer Prize for Public Service winners